Bennington is a town in Hillsborough County, New Hampshire, United States. The population was 1,501 at the 2020 census.

The main village of the town, where 338 people resided at the 2020 census, is defined as the Bennington census-designated place (CDP) and is located on the Contoocook River at the intersection of New Hampshire routes 31 and 47.

History

Situated in an area once called "Society Land", the town was formed from parts of Deering, Francestown, Greenfield and Hancock. It was named to commemorate the 1777 Battle of Bennington, an American Revolutionary War battle fought in New York near Bennington, Vermont. The Vermont town in turn derived its name from New Hampshire governor Benning Wentworth. The town was incorporated in 1842. The first census, taken in 1850, recorded 541 residents.

The first gristmill was built in 1782, with a cotton mill in 1810. A tannery and tool manufacturing industry would follow. A factory with paper-making machinery was established in 1835, located at or near the site of the present-day Monadnock Paper Mill. In 1858, the town's industries included a cutlery manufacturer, a gristmill, two paper mills, and a sawmill. Bennington also had quite a number of farms.

In 1874, plans were underway to build the Peterborough and Hillsborough railroad through Bennington.

Geography
Bennington is drained by the north-flowing Contoocook River, which forms Powder Mill Pond on the southern boundary. Bennington lies fully within the Merrimack River watershed.

Transportation
The town is crossed by U. S. Route 202 and state routes 31 and 47. It is bordered by the towns of Deering to the northeast, Francestown to the east, Greenfield to the south, Hancock to the southwest, and Antrim to the west and north.

Adjacent municipalities 
 Antrim, New Hampshire (north)
 Deering, New Hampshire (northeast)
 Francestown, New Hampshire (east)
 Greenfield, New Hampshire (south)
 Hancock, New Hampshire (west)

Demographics

As of the census of 2010, there were 1,476 people, 564 households, and 386 families residing in the town. There were 666 housing units, of which 102, or 15.3%, were vacant. 43 of the vacant units were for seasonal or recreational use. The racial makeup of the town was 97.4% white, 0.4% African American, 0.1% Native American, 0.6% Asian, 0.0% Native Hawaiian or Pacific Islander, 0.4% some other race, and 1.1% from two or more races. 0.9% of the population were Hispanic or Latino of any race.

Of the 564 households, 35.8% had children under the age of 18 living with them, 49.6% were headed by married couples living together, 13.5% had a female householder with no husband present, and 31.6% were non-families. 24.3% of all households were made up of individuals, and 5.8% were someone living alone who was 65 years of age or older. The average household size was 2.62, and the average family size was 3.08.

In the town, 25.7% of the population were under the age of 18, 9.6% were from 18 to 24, 26.3% from 25 to 44, 29.6% from 45 to 64, and 8.9% were 65 years of age or older. The median age was 38.3 years. For every 100 females, there were 107.3 males. For every 100 females age 18 and over, there were 107.0 males.

For the period 2011–2015, the estimated median annual income for a household was $65,481, and the median income for a family was $75,278. Male full-time workers had a median income of $47,000 versus $39,659 for females. The per capita income for the town was $28,071. 4.5% of the population and 4.5% of families were below the poverty line. 2.0% of the population under the age of 18 and 2.4% of those 65 or older were living in poverty.

Economy
Bennington is the home of the Monadnock Paper Mills as well as Crotched Mountain Ski & Ride, a medium-sized ski resort on the Francestown line.

Education 
Bennington is part of SAU (School Administrative Unit) #1, which is a school district that includes 9 towns, better known as the Contoocook Valley Regional School District.  Students from Bennington attend the following schools:

Elementary: Pierce School, located in Bennington
Middle: Great Brook School, located in Antrim
High: ConVal Regional High School, located in Peterborough

References

 A. J. Coolidge & J. B. Mansfield, A History and Description of New England, 1859; H. O. Houghton & Company, printers; Cambridge, Massachusetts

External links

 
 G. E. P. Dodge Library
 New Hampshire Economic and Labor Market Information Bureau Profile

 
Towns in Hillsborough County, New Hampshire
Towns in New Hampshire